A foam party is a social event at which participants dance to music on a dance floor covered in several feet of suds or bubbles, dispensed from a foam machine.

History

Foam parties can be dated back to A Rhapsody in Black and Blue, a 1932 short film directed by Aubrey Scotto, wherein Louis Armstrong dances, sings, and plays his trumpet in a large area of soap suds. Songs performed in the foam are "I'll Be Glad When You're Dead, You Rascal You" and "Shine". Another film featuring foam parties is The Party, featuring Peter Sellers.

Modern foam parties were developed in the early 1990s by club promoters in Ibiza. Generally, machines were large, ceiling-mounted foam generators, created by Weird Dream Productions, that created a large volume of foam that fell from the ceiling onto clubbers. The large water usage and subsequent cleanup required made this impractical for many venues., resulting in a demand upon Weird Dream Productions to modify their foam to be of low water content. Weird Dreams achieved this in model Mk III which produced 200,000 litres per minute with just 50l of water. UK style leaders Big Fun and Roy Barlow Leisure purchased machines from Weird Dream Productions and later began manufacturing their own versions, creating a global market for the product, and these three companies remained global market leaders throughout the craze. All market leaders were UK-based until around 2004. In recent years, there has been a large growth in at-home parties. In the kids birthday and party market, there are many companies offering parties for front or back yards, using the water and electricity of the homeowner. Sometimes you can rent inflatables to contain the foam.  While they are great to contain the foam these take up a lot of space. In warmer climates, kids often wear bathing suits. Today, there are a few companies that make Foam Canons from industrial fans and pipes. 

As Ibiza foam parties became more popular, the craze spread, and the foam cannon was developed by Roy Barlow from The Entertainment Biz and Robin Wincup from Galaxy. 

In the 1990s, foam parties were performed weekly at Amnesia in Ibiza.

Safety
There are numerous hazards associated with foam parties. In 2008, three people were electrocuted and two others injured at a foam party at the Venezia Palace Hotel in Antalya, Turkey.

References

External links
 

Parties